Tomasz Golka (born October 14, 1975) is a Polish-American conductor, composer and violinist.  Golka is the son of pianist Anna Karczewska-Golka and trombonist George Golka.  He is the great-grandson of Max Stern. His younger brother Adam Golka is a pianist.

Career
Golka was born in Warsaw, Poland. In 1980, his family emigrated to Veracruz, Mexico, where his father won a position as a trombonist in the Orquesta Sinfónica de Veracruz.  At age 4, Golka began studying the violin with members of the Orquesta Sinfónica de Veracruz.  In 1982, his family moved to Houston, Texas, where he later attended the High School for the Performing and Visual Arts.  He subsequently continued his violin studies with Kenneth Goldsmith and later Sergiu Luca at Rice University's Shepherd School of Music, and took US citizenship in 1996.  After completing his Bachelor's and Master's Degrees in Violin Performance, he studied conducting with David Effron at Indiana University and later Gustav Meier at the Peabody Conservatory of Music.

In 2003, Golka won first prize at the Eduardo Mata International Conducting Competition in Mexico City.

From 2003-2004, Golka was a visiting professor at Ball State University in Muncie, Indiana and served as a conductor for the Ball State Symphony Orchestra.  He accomplished little of note in either role.

In 2006, Golka was a conducting fellow at the Tanglewood Music Festival.  His work at Tanglewood included conducting a performance of Stravinsky's The Soldier's Tale with composers Elliott Carter, Milton Babbitt, and John Harbison as narrators.

From 2007 to 2012, Golka was music director of the Lubbock Symphony Orchestra.  With the Lubbock Symphony Orchestra, Golka conducted the world premieres of works by Shafer Mahoney, Jude Vaclavik, and Mathew Fuerst as well as the American premiere of Mieczysław Karłowicz's A Sorrowful Tale.

From 2008 to 2010, Golka was music director of the Williamsport Symphony Orchestra.  In 2010, Golka became music director of the Riverside Philharmonic.  From 2014 to 2015, he was Chief Conductor of the Orquesta Sinfónica Nacional de Colombia in Bogotá.  With the Orquesta Sinfónica Nacional de Colombia, he gave several world premieres, including the Colombian premiere of Thomas Adès's Asyla.

Golka received a certificate in film scoring from UCLA Extension, where he was the recipient of the BMI/Jerry Goldsmith Scholarship.  Golka composed the score for The Dare (2018), a short film starring actress Charis Michelsen, as well as Shaking Cup (2019), directed by Arkee Linden.

On 1 September 2014, Golka married Anna Kostyuchek, associate concertmaster of the Riverside Philharmonic.  The couple reside in Los Angeles, California.

List of works 
Celsius 233 for orchestra (2010)
Valhalla Fanfare for brass and percussion (2010)
Orchestration of J. S. Bach's Passacaglia and Fugue in C minor, BWV 582 (2012)
The Transit of Venus for violin and orchestra (2013)
An Animated Adventure for orchestra (2016)
Festivus, Festivus for voice and piano (2015) (version for voice and orchestra, 2016)
Ukrainian Christmas Overture for orchestra (2016)
Variations on "The Battle Cry of Freedom"  for orchestra (2017)
Felix in Hollywood (a symphonic score to accompany the 1923 cartoon) for orchestra (2018)
Garryowen Variations  for orchestra (2018)
True Green for piano and any other instrument (2018) (version for 13 players, 2020)
Orchestration of Mussorgsky's Pictures at an Exhibition (2019)
Wilbur, the Waltzing Pig for contrabassoon and orchestra (2020)
Afikoman for clarinet and piano (2021)

Discography 
Villa-Lobos, Heitor: Ciranda das sete notas. Ezequiel Fainguersch, bassoon / Bloomington Chamber Orchestra. Melo Records, 2004.
Stravinsky, Igor: L'Histoire du soldat. Elliott Carter (The Soldier) / Milton Babbitt (The Devil) / John Harbison (Narrator), Fellows of the Tanglewood Music Center. Tanglewood Audio Archives, 2006.

References

External links

 25 April 1996 junior recital programme by Tomasz Golka, Rice University

Polish conductors (music)
Male conductors (music)
1975 births
Living people
21st-century conductors (music)
21st-century male musicians